The Southern Combination Challenge Cup is a football competition contested by non-league clubs. An independent cup, it was directly affiliated to the Football Association until 2015, when a change in FA Rules required such competitions to affiliate with the county of the majority of its member clubs: this is currently the Surrey County FA for this competition. The competition was founded in March 1958, as the Southern Combination Amateur Challenge Cup Competition. The word "Amateur" was later dropped in 1974. It is often referred to as simply the Southern Combination Cup.

The competition's rules state that entrants must be based within 25 miles of Weybridge, Surrey (until 1998, within 25 miles of Kingston upon Thames).  At least two other competitions with similar names existed, in different areas of south east England:

(1) the Southern Counties Combination Football League started in 1971 as a league competition in Sussex (and later southern parts of Surrey), with an associated League Cup and, a few years later, a Midweek Floodlight [Cup] Competition.  This competition closed down in 2002, with the last winners being Fleet Town - a club from Hampshire who, incidentally, have also entered the Southern Combination Challenge Cup.

(2) the Southern Combination Cup, which started around 1980, and offered a set of the sponsors', Phillips', floodlights to the inaugural winners.  In some years, a Reserve Section was also contested.  Known entrants were from the Hertfordshire and Bedfordshire area, but the competition ceased following Stotfold's victory in 1996.

Hampton & Richmond Borough are the most successful club in the competition's history, having lifted the cup eight times. With seven of those coming under the name of Hampton, their most recent success came during the 2004–05 season. There have been 24 different winners, with Sutton Common Rovers the current holders after beating Camberley Town in May 2017.

History 
Until the 1994–95 season, the competition would comprise a maximum 16 teams starting in the First Round. If extra clubs were competing that year, a Preliminary Round would be added. However, this figure rose to 20 teams ahead of the 1998-99 campaign and the AGM agreed to start the competition in the Second Round, should 16 teams be included. They believed the suffix of Preliminary Round added to the difficulty of selling fixtures to the paying public. The final Preliminary Round fixture came during the 1994–95 season, with Epsom & Ewell recording a 6–0 victory over Walton & Hersham in a replay.

Penalties were introduced into the competition in 1979, but only if both clubs agreed and liaised with the match officials beforehand. They were made compulsory in 1995, should any game be drawn following extra time. In recent years, the competition has typically been dominated by teams in the ninth and tenth tiers of the English football league system, although other non-league teams, such as Staines Town and Leatherhead, have also used the competition as a Reserve team event. The Combined Counties Football League has labelled the competition "a supplementary Combined Counties League Cup".

Finals 
Season-by-season list of winners and runners-up.

Results by team 
A list of all clubs to have reached the Final of the competition since formation.

† denotes that in this year the final was unplayed and the cup was shared between the two clubs who qualified for it.  These instances are counted as ½ in the "Winners" and "Runners-Up" columns, with the year recorded in the "Winning Years" column.

See also 
 Combined Counties Football League

References

Football in Surrey
Football cup competitions in England
Recurring events established in 1958